Makénéné is a town and commune in Cameroon. It is located in the Mbam-et-Inoubou department of the Centre region.

According to the 2005 census, the commune had a population of 16,564.

Transportation

Cameroon National Highway N4 is the main road in Makénéné and paved route.

Transportation within Makénéné are mainly taxis, urban buses. Regional buses connect Makénéné with neighbouring areas via N4.

Notable people from Makénéné
 
 Tchamo Bosco Siakam former mayor of the town (2007-2015)
 Pascal Siakam, a Cameroonian professional basketball player for the Toronto Raptors of the National Basketball Association (NBA)
David Leon Mayebi (1954-2016) former footballer and manager; deceased in 2016 and father of footballer Joslain Mayebi

Communities within Makénéné

Villages within Makénéné are clustered along Cameroon National Highway N4:

The villages to the north end are mostly rural and sparsely populated:

 Kinding-Nde - located in the northwest over the boundary between Central and West Regions
 Kinding-Ndjabi - located in the northwest and directly south of Kinding-Nde
 Nyokon is divided into 4 smaller divisions:
 Nyokon I
 Nyokon II
 Nyokon III
 Nyokon IV

Most of the population in the commune lives in the south:
 Makénéné I - located in the south end of the commune and one of the two larger areas of the commune
 Makénéné II - located in the south end of the commune and just northwest of Makénéné I

See also
Communes of Cameroon

References

External links
 Site de la primature - Élections municipales 2002 
 Contrôle de gestion et performance des services publics communaux des villes camerounaises - Thèse de Donation Avele, Université Montesquieu Bordeaux IV 
 Charles Nanga, La réforme de l’administration territoriale au Cameroun à la lumière de la loi constitutionnelle n° 96/06 du 18 janvier 1996, Mémoire ENA. 

Populated places in Centre Region (Cameroon)
Communes of Cameroon